Muir Beach is a census designated place (CDP), unincorporated community, and beach on the Pacific Ocean. Unlike many other entities in the area, it is not named directly in honor of conservationist John Muir; instead, it was named after Muir Woods National Monument to capitalize on the latter's popularity. The population was 304 at the 2020 census. The community itself flanks the northwest side of the beach.

Redwood Creek empties into the beach. There is a parking lot at the beach, which is accessible via a footbridge.

The subdivision of homes was formerly called Bello Beach, and the beach itself was formerly called Big Lagoon after a freshwater lagoon that was located where the parking lot is now. Damage from 20th century dairy farms interfered with the flow of the creek and the lagoon.

Geography
California State Route 1 leads northeast  to U.S. Route 101 near Sausalito and northwest  to Point Reyes Station.

The beach is one of the cleanest in the state.

Demographics

2010
At the 2010 census Muir Beach had a population of 310. The racial makeup of Muir Beach was 283 (91.3%) White, 5 (1.6%) African American, 1 (0.3%) Native American, 12 (3.9%) Asian, 1 (0.3%) from other races, and 8 (2.6%) from two or more races. Hispanic or Latino of any race were 7 people (2.3%).

The census reported that 95.8% of the population lived in households and 4.2% lived in non-institutionalized group quarters.

There were 141 households, 27 (19.1%) had children under the age of 18 living in them, 79 (56.0%) were opposite-sex married couples living together, 4 (2.8%) had a female householder with no husband present, 3 (2.1%) had a male householder with no wife present.  There were 11 (7.8%) unmarried opposite-sex partnerships, and 1 (0.7%) same-sex married couples or partnerships. 39 households (27.7%) were one person and 11 (7.8%) had someone living alone who was 65 or older. The average household size was 2.11.  There were 86 families (61.0% of households); the average family size was 2.47.

The age distribution was 38 people (12.3%) under the age of 18, 10 people (3.2%) aged 18 to 24, 56 people (18.1%) aged 25 to 44, 138 people (44.5%) aged 45 to 64, and 68 people (21.9%) who were 65 or older.  The median age was 52.6 years. For every 100 females, there were 102.6 males.  For every 100 females aged 18 and over, there were 106.1 males.

The homeowner vacancy rate was 1.0%; the rental vacancy rate was 2.6%. 75.2% of the population lived in owner-occupied housing units and 20.6% lived in rental housing units.

2000
At the 2000 census there were 295 people, 131 households, and 69 families in the CDP. The racial makeup of the CDP in 2010 was 89.7% non-Hispanic White, 0.8% non-Hispanic African American, 3.9% Asian, and 2.6% from two or more races. Hispanic or Latino of any race were 2.3%.

Of the 131 households 19.1% had children under the age of 18 living with them, 45.0% were married couples living together, 5.3% had a female householder with no husband present, and 46.6% were non-families. 30.5% of households were one person and 7.6% were one person aged 65 or older.  The average household size was 2.22 and the average family size was 2.67.

The age distribution was 14.2% under the age of 18, 2.7% from 18 to 24, 26.1% from 25 to 44, 46.8% from 45 to 64, and 10.2% 65 or older.  The median age was 48 years. For every 100 females, there were 90.3 males.  For every 100 females aged 18 and over, there were 91.7 males.

The median household income was $125,402 and the median family income  was $152,174. The per capita income for the CDP was $66,476.  None of the families and 10.5% of the population were living below the poverty line.

Education
Muir Beach is in the Mill Valley School District, Tamalpais Union High School District, and the Marin Community College District.  Students attend public schools in or near Mill Valley at Tamalpais Valley Elementary School (kindergarten - grade 5), Mill Valley Middle School (grades 6 - 8), and Tamalpais High School (grades 9 - 12).

Climate
According to the Köppen Climate Classification system, Muir Beach has a warm-summer Mediterranean climate, abbreviated "Csb" on climate maps. Like much of the California coast, summer afternoons are often cool and windy (and sometimes foggy) as winds blow in off the ocean.

Local government
Muir Beach is unincorporated, receiving general government services from Marin County, including law enforcement, land-use planning, library, public health, and code enforcement. A special district, the Muir Beach Community Services District, provides local services, including fire protection, water, road maintenance, and recreation. The District has a board of directors, with five members elected to four-year terms.  The District includes all of the Muir Beach CDP, plus Green Gulch Farm. (See map of MBCSD.)

Notable history 
On December 11, 1965, Muir Beach was the site of the Third Acid Test.

See also

Notes

External links

Muir Beach unofficial website
Muir Beach Community Services District

Census-designated places in California
Census-designated places in Marin County, California
Populated coastal places in California
West Marin
Beaches of Marin County, California